A by-election was held for the New South Wales Legislative Assembly electorate of Yass Plains on 15 August 1861 because of the resignation of Henry O'Brien due to ill health.

Dates

Result

Henry O'Brien resigned.

See also
Electoral results for the district of Yass Plains
List of New South Wales state by-elections

References

1861 elections in Australia
New South Wales state by-elections
1860s in New South Wales